Abbey Wood is a National Rail station in Abbey Wood in southeast London, England. The station is managed by Transport for London with passenger services provided by Southeastern, Thameslink and the Elizabeth line. It is the closest railway station to the suburb of Thamesmead, which is connected to the station by local buses. The station platforms are located in the Royal Borough of Greenwich with the station entrance in the London Borough of Bexley.

History

It was opened on 30 July 1849 by the South Eastern Railway, whose operations were handed over to the South Eastern and Chatham Railway in 1899. It became part of the Southern Railway under the grouping of 1923. The line then passed on to the Southern Region of British Railways on nationalisation in 1948. When BR was divided into sectors in the 1980s the station was served by Network SouthEast until the privatisation of British Railways.

During the 1860s William Morris famously used a decorated wagon to commute between this station and his new home at Red House, Bexleyheath, occasionally with his eccentric and artistic house guests.

The ticket office at Abbey Wood was APTIS-equipped by November 1986, making it one of the first stations with the ticketing system which was eventually found across the UK at all staffed British Rail stations by the end of the 1980s.

The station was to be served by the proposed Greenwich Waterfront Transit, however the project was cancelled by Mayor of London Boris Johnson owing to lack of funds.

Elizabeth Line 

Abbey Wood is the terminus of one of two eastern branches of the Elizabeth Line and offers interchange between terminating Elizabeth Line services (at 12 trains per hour on new line) and existing Southeastern and Thameslink services.

The Elizabeth Line provides a link north west to ExCeL London and Canary Wharf, then onwards to the city centre, Heathrow Airport and Reading.

Station buildings

The first station opened with the line in 1849 and was a typical South Eastern Railway brick building with metal platform shelters.

The station has been rebuilt twice over the past 50 years to cater for the changing nature of the area. In 1987 a new station was constructed which, in 2014, was replaced by Network Rail with an interim station whilst the new Crossrail station was constructed. The new station opened on 23 October 2017. It was designed by architects Fereday Pollard and includes step free interchange between platforms and bus connections with the Harrow Manorway, a dual carriageway which runs next to the ticket hall.

Services

National Rail

The typical off-peak service in trains per hour is:
 4 tph to London Cannon Street (2 of these run via  and 2 run via )
 2 tph to  via Greenwich 
 2 tph to 
 2 tph to  via 

During the peak hours, the station is served by an additional half-hourly circular service to and from London Cannon Street via  and Lewisham in the clockwise direction and via Greenwich in the anticlockwise direction.

Elizabeth line
Elizabeth line services began calling at Abbey Wood on 24 May 2022 and all services are operated using  EMUs.

The typical off-peak service in trains per hour is:
 2 tph to 
 2 tph to 

The Elizabeth line did not not initially run on Sundays, but a Sunday service was introduced on 6 November 2022.

Connections
London Buses routes 180, 229, 244, 301, 469, 472, B11, school routes 602, 669 and night route N1 serve the station.

Future

London Overground 
An extension of the London Overground Gospel Oak to Barking line from Barking across the river to Thamesmead and Abbey Wood was proposed in August 2015. The section from Barking to Barking Riverside opened in summer 2022, but there are no current plans to extend the line further towards Abbey Wood. Rather than this, in 2019 Transport for London and City Hall proposed an extension of the Docklands Light Railway (DLR) to serve Thamesmead as part of the proposed Thamesmead and Abbey Wood OAPF (Opportunity Area Planning Framework). A DLR extension was chosen due to lower connectivity benefits of an Overground extension, the low frequency (4 trains an hour) of the Gospel Oak to Barking line, and — most significantly — a construction cost twice as much as the DLR, as the gradients required to cross the River Thames would require large scale tunnelling works when compared to the DLR. Despite making this recommendation, the consultation also noted that an extension of the Gospel Oak to Barking line could provide good orbital transport links in the long term.

Elizabeth line 
As of 2021 there were proposals to extend some Elizabeth Line services further east to Gravesend and Hoo Junction; the route is safeguarded and would use one of the two terminating tracks at Abbey Wood onto either existing National Rail tracks (upgraded for AC) or a separate 4-track line. Another proposal is continuing Elizabeth line services to  along existing tracks, although those lines are congested and may delay the Elizabeth line services.

Trivia
Alphabetically, it is the first National Rail station in the UK, with the last being Ystrad Rhondda railway station in south Wales.

References

Bibliography

External links

 The remodelled exterior of Abbey Wood station Image at Crossrail, London
 fereday pollard
 marks barfield
 Abbey Wood station on navigable O.S. map

Railway stations in the London Borough of Bexley
Railway stations in the Royal Borough of Greenwich
Former South Eastern Railway (UK) stations
Railway stations in Great Britain opened in 1849
Railway stations served by Southeastern
Railway stations served by the Elizabeth line
1849 establishments in England
Railway stations served by Govia Thameslink Railway